Cheikh Ahmadou Bamba Mbacke Dieng (born 23 March 2000) is a Senegalese professional footballer who plays as a forward for Ligue 1 club Lorient and the Senegal national team.

Club career
Dieng began his career with Diambars in the Senegal Premier League, and had 12 goals in his first 14 games in his debut season. He finished as the top scorer of the Senegal Premier League for the 2019–20 season.

Dieng signed for Marseille on 5 October 2020. He made his debut the club in a 2–0 Coupe de France win over Auxerre on 10 February 2021, scoring a goal in the 92nd minute of the game.

On 27 January 2023, Dieng signed a two-and-a-half-year contract for Lorient.

International career
Dieng debuted with the Senegal national team in a 4–1 2022 FIFA World Cup qualification win over Namibia on 9 October 2021.

He was called up to the Senegal squad for the 2021 Africa Cup of Nations in January 2022, scoring his first goal for the side in a 2–0 round of 16 victory over Cape Verde. In the 2021 Africa Cup of Nations Final, Dieng scored in the penalty shootout to help Senegal become the champions of the tournament.

Career statistics

Club

International

Scores and results list Senegal's goal tally first, score column indicates score after each Dieng goal.

Honours
Senegal
 Africa Cup of Nations: 2021

Individual
 Ligue 1 Goal of the Year: 2021–22

References

External links
 
 Marseille profile
 
 

2000 births
Living people
People from Diourbel Region
Senegalese footballers
Association football forwards
Senegal international footballers
Senegal youth international footballers
Africa Cup of Nations-winning players
2021 Africa Cup of Nations players
2022 FIFA World Cup players
ASC SUNEOR players
Diambars FC players
Olympique de Marseille players
FC Lorient players
Senegal Premier League players
Ligue 1 players
Senegalese expatriate footballers
Senegalese expatriate sportspeople in France
Expatriate footballers in France